The John Shutter House is a historic house at Austin and Main Streets in Pangburn, Arkansas.  It is a -story wood-frame house, with a side-gable roof and a stone foundation.  A hip-roofed porch extends across part of the front, supported by wooden columns mounted on stuccoed piers.  A shed-roofed carport extends to the left side of the house.  The house was built in 1908, and is one of a modest number of houses in White County surviving from that period.

The house was listed on the National Register of Historic Places in 1991.

See also
National Register of Historic Places listings in White County, Arkansas

References

Houses on the National Register of Historic Places in Arkansas
Houses completed in 1908
Houses in White County, Arkansas
National Register of Historic Places in White County, Arkansas
1908 establishments in Arkansas